The women's 400 metres at the 2019 World Athletics Championships was held at the Khalifa International Stadium in Doha, Qatar, from 30 September to 3 October 2019.

Summary
The 2019 season saw only four women break 50 seconds. World leader Shaunae Miller-Uibo did it three times.  Salwa Eid Naser broke it once, coming back against a challenge from Aminatou Seyni.  Naser was consistently under 51, five times during the 2019 IAAF Diamond League season.  Seyni was not allowed to compete in the 400 metres because of the new IAAF testosterone rule. Shericka Jackson was the fourth to break 50 at the Jamaican championships.

Those athletes were the ones to watch in the final.  With multi-toned hair, the tall Miller-Uibo started like she meant business, gaining on the stagger against defending champion Phyllis Francis to her outside and by the backstretch, Francis had already made up the stagger on Justyna Święty-Ersetic to her outside.  In the center of the track, Naser had also already made up the stagger on Wadeline Jonathas to her outside.  Miller-Uibo and Naser hit the 200 meter split marks virtually even.  Through the final turn, Naser was moving faster, opening up 4 metres by the home straight.  The first time Miller-Uibo was able to see Naser, she was already behind.  That final straight is usually Miller-Uibo's territory.  She began stretching out her long strides to reel Naser in.  Miller-Uibo steadily gained on Naser, pulling in three metres, but it wasn't enough.  Miller-Uibo set a new personal best, 48.37, which became the #6 400 metre race of all time.  Naser beat her with 48.14, the #3 400 of all time.  Jackson held off the American duo of Jonathas and Francis, all personal bests under 50 seconds.  Like all previous top 10 women's races, there were two close competitors battling to the line.

Records
Before the competition records were as follows:

The following records were set at the competition:

Schedule
The event schedule, in local time (UTC+3), was as follows:

Results

Heats
The first three in each heat (Q) and the next six fastest (q) qualified for the final.

Semi-finals

The first two in each heat (Q) and the next two fastest (q) qualified for the final.

Final
The final was started on 3 October at 23:50.

References

400
400 metres at the World Athletics Championships